was a political party in Japan.

History
The party was established in May 1894 as a merger of the Dōmei Seisha and Dōshi Seisha, which together had won 42 seats in the March 1894 elections, although only 40 National Diet members remained by the time of the merger. Five members later broke away to establish the Chūgoku Progressive Party.

In the September 1894 elections it won 30 seats. In February 1896 it merged with Rikken Kaishintō, the Chūgoku Progressive Party, Teikoku Zaisei Kakushin-kai and Ōte Club to form Shimpotō.

Election results

References

Defunct political parties in Japan
Political parties established in 1894
1894 establishments in Japan
Political parties disestablished in 1896
1896 disestablishments in Japan